The Nobel Laboratory is a laboratory museum in Karlskoga, Sweden, completed in 1895. The laboratory building sits near Björkborn Manor and the pedestrian Björkborn Bridge.

Since the museum opened, the building has housed an exhibition on Alfred Nobel, his inventions, and businesses.

See also 

 Bofors

References 

Alfred Nobel
Buildings and structures completed in the 19th century
Buildings and structures in Karlskoga Municipality
Museums in Örebro County
Laboratories in Sweden